The Calvinist Church at Hrnčiarska ulica (English: Pottery Street) in Košice, Slovakia was initially an army store-house.

In the years 1805–11 it was rebuilt to a Calvinist church with a new 48-metre slender spire. The church interior is very simple, the only presentable piece is the pulpit. A metal rooster made in 1589 was given on the spire. Initially it was installed on the northern tower of the St. Elisabeth Cathedral.

Gallery

References

Churches in Košice
19th-century Calvinist and Reformed churches
19th-century churches in Slovakia
Neoclassical church buildings in Slovakia